Hueland Howard Carson (February 11, 1957 – January 21, 2021), known professionally as Howard Carson, was an American linebacker for the Los Angeles Rams. He was born in Hico, Texas, and attended Grapevine High School. After graduating high school, he began his collegiate career with the Howard Payne Yellow Jackets. He played in the NFL from 1981 to 1983, playing 28 games while starting two of them. He died in Austin, Texas, on January 21, 2021, a few weeks before his 64th birthday.

References

1957 births
2021 deaths
American football linebackers
Howard Payne Yellow Jackets football players
Los Angeles Rams players
Players of American football from Texas
People from Hico, Texas